"Wrong Idea" is a song by American rappers Bad Azz and Snoop Dogg featuring Kokane, and Lil'  Dead. It was released in 2001 as the single of Bad Azz's studio album Personal Business and Snoop Dogg's fifth studio album Tha Last Meal, with the record labels Doggystyle Records and Priority Records.

Track listing 
CD Single
Wrong Idea (Clean) (featuring Snoop Dogg, Kokane, and Lil'  Dead) — 4:03
Wrong Idea (Instrumental) — 4:17

Chart performance

Weekly charts

References

2001 singles
Snoop Dogg songs
Songs written by Snoop Dogg
2001 songs
Songs written by Larry Blackmon